Potato dextrose agar (BAM Media M127) and potato dextrose broth are common microbiological growth media made from potato infusion and dextrose. Potato dextrose agar (abbreviated "PDA") is the most widely used medium for growing fungi and bacteria.

Typical composition  
{| class=wikitable style="text-align:center;"
|-
! value || ingredients & conditions 
|-
|| 1000 mL || water
|-
|| 4 g (from 200 g infused potato) || potatoes(sliced washed unpeeled)
|-
|| 20 g || dextrose
|-
|| 20 g || agar powder
|-
|| 5.6±0.2 || final pH 
|-
|| 25°C || temperature 
|}

Potato infusion can be made by boiling  of sliced (washed but unpeeled) potatoes in ~  distilled water for 30 minutes and then decanting or straining the broth through cheesecloth.

A similar growth medium, potato dextrose broth (abbreviated "PDB"), is formulated identically to PDA, omitting the agar.  Common organisms that can be cultured on PDB are yeasts such as Candida albicans and Saccharomyces cerevisiae and molds such as Aspergillus niger.

References

Further reading 
 Atlas, R.M.: Handbook of Microbiological Media, second edition. Lawrence C. Parks (1997)

Microbiological media
Potatoes